Frederick Smith (31 March 1837 – 27 March 1923) was a Barbadian cricketer. He played in three first-class matches for the Barbados cricket team from 1864 to 1872. He was also the first player to captain Barbados in a match.

See also
 List of Barbadian representative cricketers

References

External links
 

1837 births
1923 deaths
Barbadian cricketers
Barbados cricketers
People from Saint Michael, Barbados